The Pyrates is a comic novel by George MacDonald Fraser, published in 1983. Fraser called it "a burlesque fantasy on every swashbuckler I ever read or saw".

Plot
Written in arch, ironic style and containing a great deal of deliberate anachronism, it traces the adventures of a classic hero (Captain Benjamin Avery, RN, very loosely based on Henry Avery), multiple damsels in distress, and the six captains who lead the infamous Coast Brotherhood (Calico Jack Rackham, Black Bilbo, Firebeard, Happy Dan Pew, Akbar the Terrible and Sheba the She-Wolf). It also concerns the charismatic anti-hero, Colonel Thomas Blood (cashiered), a rakish dastard who is loosely modeled on the historical figure, Thomas Blood. All of the above face off against the malevolently hilarious Spanish viceroy of Cartagena, Don Lardo. The book's 400 pages of continuous action travel from England to Madagascar to various Caribbean ports of call along the Spanish Main.

Adaptations
The book is completely unrelated to the 1991 movie Pyrates starring Kevin Bacon.

1986 TV version

A television adaptation starring Marcus Gilbert and Jane Snowden was shown on BBC2 on 28 December 1986.

The film was one of a number made by the team of Andrew Gosling and Ian Keill.

Cast
Marcus Gilbert as Captain Ben Avery 
Tom Adams as Calico Jack Rackham 
Josette Simon as Sheba 
Malcolm Stoddard as Colonel Blood 
Nicholas Gecks as Happy Dan Pew 
Wanda Ventham as Anne Bonney 
Tatyana Colombo as Donna Meliflua
John Savident as Don Lardo 
Robin Bailey as Solomon 
Howard Lang as Captain Yardley 
John Rapley as Samuel Pepys 
Howard Goorney as Groonbaun 
Nosher Powell as Firebeard 
Richard Davies as Dai Lemmer

Stage version
A world premiere stage adaptation was written and produced by members of Chicago's Defiant Theatre in 2004.

Captain in Calico
Much of the material had been covered in a novel Fraser wrote in 1959, Captain in Calico. This novel was published after his death.

References

External links
1986 BBC production at the IMDb
The Pyrates at British Film Institute

1983 British novels
Historical novels
Novels about pirates
Cultural depictions of Anne Bonny
Cultural depictions of Calico Jack
British novels adapted into films
British novels adapted into plays
British novels adapted into television shows
William Collins, Sons books